The 1909–10 St Helens R.F.C. season was the club's 15th in the NRFU, the 36th in their history. The club finished 10th out of 28 in the Championship. In the Lancashire League, St Helens finished fifth out of 12. In the Challenge Cup, the club were beaten in the second round by Halifax.

NRFU Championship

References

St Helens R.F.C. seasons
St Helens RLFC season, 1909
St Helens RLFC season, 1910
1909 in English rugby league
1910 in English rugby league